Party institutionalism is an approach that sees political parties as having some capacities for adaptation, but also sees them as being "prisoners of their own history as an institution". Aspects of the ideology that a party had when it was founded, persists even though the conditions and the party-base in society have changed. Scholars of this approach claim that the party's history determines how the party adapts to modern day challenges.

The left–right is still central in order to understand a party's policy, but the core of these theories is to compare the party's beliefs and values today with the ones at their founding. In analyzing a party's ideological orientation we must begin by analyzing the very origin of the party.

One framework within this tradition is offered by Klaus von Beyme who identifies nine party-groups, or "familles spirituelles", that can be found in European liberal democracies today:

 Liberal and Radical parties
 Conservative parties
 Socialist and Social Democratic parties
 Christian Democratic parties
 Communist parties
 Agrarian parties
 Regional and ethnic parties
 Right-wing extremist parties
 Ecology movement

Von Beyme claims that at the time of their founding these parties reflected the needs to defend a particular kind of interests, but recognized that not every European party could be fitted into this schema. He has been criticized of being tempted to try to fit too many parties into this schema, when in reality there is not grounds for doing so. It needs to be said as well that quite many of the European parties classified into the categories above are regarded as having more or less lost contact with their original "famille spirituelle".

Consequently one can wonder what, eg, the British Conservatives today have in common with their founding fathers hundreds of years ago, taking into account New Right ideas and certain aspects of liberalism applied by the party. Likewise the Norwegian Social Democratic party is widely held to have moved away drastically from its inception as a socialist party in 1889. Today this party has assumed more of a centralist role (regarding for instance issues like state ownership as well as abandoning their corporatist ties with the Norwegian Trade Association).

One might ask what the point is of classifying the parties into these categories when they do not fit. The answer would be that one should look at the broad picture, and use von Beyme’s tool to make sense of certain tendencies in European politics.
However, it would also be important to recognize the fact that western European societies have changed tremendously in course of the last decades regarding a number of issues. Therefore, by identifying these factors one might also broaden the understanding of the generally changing patterns of party ideology in Europe today, compared to the 1950s.

References

Institutionalism
Political parties
Political science theories